is a passenger railway station located in Tarumi-ku, Kobe, Hyōgo Prefecture, Japan, operated by the private Sanyo Electric Railway.

Lines

Station layout
The station consists of two elevated side platforms with the station building underneath. The station is unattended.

Platforms

Adjacent stations

|-
!colspan=5|Sanyo Electric Railway

History
It was renamed  on November 20, 1943, and renamed to its present name on April 7, 1991

Passenger statistics
In fiscal 2018, the station was used by an average of 805 passengers daily (boarding passengers only).

Surrounding area
 JR Shioya Station
 Shioya Beach
 Mount James

See also
List of railway stations in Japan

References

External links

 Official website (Sanyo Electric Railway) 

Railway stations in Japan opened in 1913
Railway stations in Kobe